Canada Creek Ranch is an unincorporated community in Montmorency Township, Montmorency County in the U.S. state of Michigan.  It is a census-designated place (CDP) used for statistical purposes. The population was 405 at the 2000 census.

Geography

Demographics

As of the census of 2000, there were 405 people, 207 households, and 144 families residing in the CDP. The racial makeup of the CDP was 99.01% White, and 0.99% from two or more races. Hispanic or Latino of any race were 0.25% of the population.

There were 207 households, out of which 10.6% had children under the age of 18 living with them, 65.7% were married couples living together, 2.9% had a female householder with no husband present, and 30.4% were non-families. 28.0% of all households were made up of individuals, and 20.3% had someone living alone who was 65 years of age or older.  The average household size was 1.96 and the average family size was 2.33.

In the CDP, the population was spread out, with 11.6% under the age of 18, 0.7% from 18 to 24, 9.4% from 25 to 44, 35.8% from 45 to 64, and 42.5% who were 65 years of age or older.  The median age was 62 years. For every 100 females, there were 89.3 males.  For every 100 females age 18 and over, there were 89.4 males.

The median income for a household in the CDP was $32,857, and the median income for a family was $37,500. Males had a median income of $28,750 versus $21,250 for females. The per capita income for the CDP was $20,227.  About 2.8% of families and 2.6% of the population were below the poverty line, including none of those under age 18 and 5.6% of those age 65 or over.

References

Unincorporated communities in Montmorency County, Michigan
Census-designated places in Michigan
Unincorporated communities in Michigan
Census-designated places in Montmorency County, Michigan